Alexander McDonald, M'Donald or MacDonald (1794 – 23 March 1860) was a Scottish sculptor specialising in granite. He was also an expert on Egyptian granite sculpture.

As a company, they were responsible for a huge number of major public monuments, graves and drinking fountains, all executed in polished granite, a technique perfected by the company.

The firm of Alexander McDonald & Co lasted from 1820 until 1941. Their most noteworthy works include the fountains in Trafalgar Square and the tomb of Albert and Queen Victoria.

Alexander McDonald Sr.
He was born in the parish of Rannoch in Perthshire in 1794, the son of a crofter.

He adapted the machines and equipment developed by Stewart McGlashan to enable the sculpting of granite. This had not been done since the time of the ancient Egyptians due to the extreme difficulty of working granite with any degree of accuracy. He travelled to the British Museum in London to make careful studies of the granite sculptures from ancient Egypt, removed from Luxor and Carnac. These inspired him to reinvent the lost skill of sculpting in granite.

Taking machinery to Aberdeen (the main area of granite quarrying in Scotland) from 1829 onwards he developed a major (and highly profitable) business in creation of granite sculptures and headstones, of growing complexity with the passage of time. He also appears to have invested in nearby granite quarries, including Dancing Cairns Quarry in the Bucksburn district of north-west Aberdeen.

In 1838 he went into business with William Leslie of Nethermuir, a building contractor and architect (and later Lord Provost of Aberdeen) but the business was dissolved in 1853 due to Leslie's growing interest in Aberdeen politics.

In the Great Exhibition of 1851 at the Crystal Palace in London they earned several medals for the quality of their work.

In the final years before his death he brought William Leslie of Nethermuir into the company to create McDonald & Leslie.

He died of bronchitis on 23 March 1860 at his townhouse, 7 Bon Accord Square in Aberdeen.

Alexander McDonald jr.
His son (1837-1884) continued the firm after his father's death. William Leslie appears to have got on better with father than son, and resigned in 1863 to go into local politics. McDonald jr. had brought Sydney Field into the firm in 1860 to increase artistry, and made him a full partner in 1863 when Leslie left, creating McDonald & Field.

In 1864 Alexander had a stroke, and was confined to a wheelchair for the rest of his life. He continued to run the company and continued to enter international competitions winning further medals at the Paris Exhibition of 1867, the Philadelphia Exposition of 1876 and Melbourne International Exhibition (1880).

In 1867 they received a hugely important commission from Queen Victoria to create a Cairngall granite sarcophagus for Prince Albert to be placed in Frogmore, with the effigies on the upper slab being designed by Carlo Marochetti. Following this the firm declared themselves as "granite sculptors to the Queen".

He made a trip to Rome in 1869 to make studies of sculpture.

Around 1870 he commissioned Kepplestone House in Aberdeen and was thereafter referred to as Alexander McDonald of Kepplestone.

He died on 27 December 1884 and is buried in a huge pink granite sarcophagus of his own design in the churchyard of St Machar's Cathedral.

On his death he bequeathed 150 paintings to Aberdeen Art Gallery and Museum, including works by Joseph Edgar Boehm, George Anderson Lawson, G F Watts, Sir Joseph Noel Paton, G D Leslie, Sir Frederick Leighton, William MacTaggart and Edward Poynter.

Continuing work
On McDonald jr's death, Sydney Field also decided to quit, and sold his share in the company to Robert Ferguson late in 1884. Ferguson kept his name out of the firm's name and renamed it simply MacDonald & Co also creating a sister company the Aberdeen Granite Works.

By the end of the 19th century the company had also opened two premises in Glasgow (Byers Road and Robertson Street) plus a premises in London (369-375 Euston Road).

The company received a group of commissions for South Africa, linked to the Boer War.

McDonald & Co and the Aberdeen Granite Works were wound up in 1941.

Works

Corinthian columns on front of St George's Hall, Liverpool (1841-1850) for C R Cockerell 
Fountains in Trafalgar Square (1845)
Monument to James Jeffrey (1848) Glasgow Necropolis
Statue of the 5th Duke of Gordon (1848) originally in Castlegate, Aberdeen, relocated to Golden Square in 1952
Huge obelisk to James McGrigor (1851) originally at Marischal College relocated to Duthie Park in 1890
Monument to Robert Baird of Auchmedden (1856) Glasgow Necropolis
Monument to Robert Barclay, shipbuilder (1864) Glasgow Necropolis designed by John Thomas Rochead
Monument to Anne Stephen (1867) Glasgow Necropolis
Monument to Elizabeth Burges (1867) Glasgow Necropolis working with Galbraith & Winton
Tomb of Queen Victoria and Prince Albert at Frogmore (1867)
Grave of William Darling (1868) Glasgow Necropolis
pedestal for statue of John Elder (1869) in Elder Park (for Joseph Edgar Boehm)
Monument to Lt Col Charles Seton Guthrie (1875) in Kensal Green Cemetery
Memorial to 74th Highlanders (1883) in Glasgow Cathedral
Mausoleum to 2nd Earl of Kilmorey (1881) in Brompton Cemetery
Mausoleum to Lt General Duncan Sim (1888) in Kensal Green Cemetery
Huge Allan monument in Glasgow Necropolis (1894-1899) working with James Pittendrigh Macgillivray who did the bronze figures
Monument to Robert Cochran, Provost of Paisley (1898) in Hawkhead Cemetery in Paisley (portrait panel stolen)
Monument to Charles Garnier in Paris (1899)
Grave of Prince Christian Victor of Schleswig-Holstein in Pretoria, South Africa (1901)
Monument to General Edward Woodgate at Spion Kop in South Africa (1901)
Monument to William Dick-Cunyngham VC at Ladysmith, South Africa (1901)
Memorial to Alfred, Duke of Saxe-Coburg and Gotha, second son of Queen Victoria (1901) at Balmoral Castle
Monument to James Wilson (1907) in Hampstead Cemetery
Granite work on Ashburnham Library in Cambridge

Drinking fountains
From around 1880 they began to specialise in drinking fountains. Notable examples include:
 James Crum Memorial Fountain (1861) George Square, Glasgow
Martyrs Memorial Fountain (1864) relocated from Castle Street to St Mungo Avenue in 1984
Richard Vaughn Yates Memorial Fountain (1858) in Liverpool (vandalised)

Artistic recognition
A bust of McDonald jr by William Brodie is held by the Aberdeen Art Gallery and Museum.

Gallery

References

1794 births
1860 deaths
People from Perthshire
Scottish sculptors
Date of birth unknown